William Slaney Kenyon-Slaney PC (24 August 1847 – 24 April 1908) was an English sportsman, soldier and politician.

Biography
Kenyon-Slaney was born in Rajkot in Gujarat in British India, the son of Captain William Kenyon of the 2nd Bombay Cavalry and Frances Catherine Slaney, daughter of Robert A. Slaney of Hatton Grange near Shifnal, Shropshire. Upon the death of Robert Slaney in 1862 the Kenyon family inherited the Slaney family estate of Hatton Grange and the Kenyon family name was changed to Kenyon-Slaney.

Kenyon-Slaney was educated at Eton College and briefly at Christ Church, Oxford, where he matriculated in 1865. In November 1867, he left Oxford and received a commission into the 3rd battalion of the Grenadier Guards.

Kenyon-Slaney was a noted sportsman and played first-class cricket for the Marylebone Cricket Club (MCC), as well as playing at county level for Shropshire between 1865 and 1879. He was also a keen association football player playing for Wanderers and was selected to play for England against Scotland in the second ever football international on 8 March 1873, where he scored two goals. Kenyon-Slaney became the first player to score in an international football match as the first international between the two nations in November the previous year had been a goalless draw.

He also took part for the Wanderers on the winning side in the 1873 FA Cup Final and on the losing side for the Old Etonians in the drawn first match of the 1875 Final and both matches of the 1876 Final.

In 1882 under the command of Sir Garnet Wolseley he took part in the Battle of Tel el-Kebir during the Urabi Revolt and was decorated for his efforts. In 1887 he was promoted to Colonel and placed on half pay. He fully retired from the military in 1892.

On 22 February 1887, he married Lady Mabel Selina Bridgeman, daughter of the 3rd Earl of Bradford; they had two children; a daughter Sybil Agnes Kenyon-Slaney (b. 1888) and a son Robert Orlando Rodolph Kenyon-Slaney (b. 1892) who was High Sheriff of Shropshire in 1935.

After unsuccessfully contesting the Wellington division of Shropshire in the 1885 general election, Kenyon-Slaney was in 1886 elected to Parliament to represent the Newport division of Shropshire for the Conservative Party which he represented until his death (after an attack of gout) in 1908. He was buried at St Andrew's Parish Churchyard, Ryton, Shropshire.

See also
 List of England international footballers born outside England
 List of English cricket and football players

References

External links
 
Cricinfo - Players and Officials - William Kenyon-Slaney at content-uk.cricinfo.com 
Profile at englandfootballonline

1847 births
1908 deaths
Alumni of Christ Church, Oxford
Association football forwards
British Army personnel of the Anglo-Egyptian War
British sportsperson-politicians
Conservative Party (UK) MPs for English constituencies
England international footballers
English cricketers
English footballers
FA Cup Final players
Grenadier Guards officers
I Zingari cricketers
Marylebone Cricket Club cricketers
Members of the Privy Council of the United Kingdom
Newport, Shropshire
Old Etonians F.C. players
Oxford University A.F.C. players
People educated at Eton College
People from Newport, Shropshire
UK MPs 1886–1892
UK MPs 1892–1895
UK MPs 1895–1900
UK MPs 1900–1906
UK MPs 1906–1910
Wanderers F.C. players
British people in colonial India